Vrenska Gorca is a settlement south of Buče in the Municipality of Kozje in eastern Slovenia. The municipality is included in the Savinja Statistical Region. The area is part of the historical region of Styria.

References

External links
Vrenska Gorca on Geopedia

Populated places in the Municipality of Kozje